The 2017 Abilene Christian Wildcats football team represented Abilene Christian University in the 2017 NCAA Division I FCS football season. The Wildcats were led by first-year head coach Adam Dorrel and played their home games at Anthony Field at Wildcat Stadium. They played as a member of the Southland Conference. They finished the season 2–9, 2–7 in Southland play to finish in eighth place.

Schedule
Source:

References

Abilene Christian
Abilene Christian Wildcats football seasons
Abilene Christian Wildcats football